Cased glass is a type of glass. It is similar to flashed glass. However, cased glass is made with thicker glass layers.

See also 
 Cameo glass
 Stained glass

References 

Glass
Glass types